Andrzej Borodzik (9 April 1930 – 13 August 2021) was a Polish chemist and scout leader and politician who served in the Sejm. He was born in Sulejówek, Poland.

References

1930 births
2021 deaths
Polish chemists
Polish Scouts and Guides
Members of the Polish Sejm 1965–1969
Members of the Polish Sejm 1969–1972
People from Mińsk County
Recipients of the Armia Krajowa Cross
Knights of the Order of Polonia Restituta
Officers of the Order of Polonia Restituta
Recipients of the Silver Cross of Merit (Poland)
Recipients of the Medal of Merit for National Defence